Beeford is a village and civil parish in the East Riding of Yorkshire, England.

According to the 2011 UK census, Beeford parish had a population of 1,078, an increase on the 2001 UK census figure of 955.

The parish church of St Leonard is a Grade II* listed building.

Beeford also has a Church of England primary school and playing fields.

References

External links

Villages in the East Riding of Yorkshire
Civil parishes in the East Riding of Yorkshire